AGLA is a kabbalistic acronym. AGLA may also refer to:

AGLA France (Association des Gays et Lesbiennes Arméniens de France)
Above-Ground Living Area (AGLA) (real-estate valuation)
Agrupación Guerrillera de Levante y Aragón, group of Spanish Maquis